Mukamel syndrome is a cutaneous condition characterized by premature graying, lentigines, depigmented macules, microcephaly, and scoliosis.

See also 
 Mulberry molar
 List of cutaneous conditions

References 

Disturbances of human pigmentation
Syndromes affecting the skin